Alyson Spiro is a British actress, best known for portraying Sarah Sugden on the British television soap opera Emmerdale from 1994–2000. She took over the role from Madeleine Howard, after she decided to leave the ITV show after six years. Spiro has also appeared in the programmes Brookside, Casualty, The Bill, Doctors, Holby City, Sapphire and Steel and Fell Tiger.

Spiro portrayed Astrid Kirchherr in the 1979 film Birth of the Beatles, and appeared in the 1985  film She'll Be Wearing Pink Pyjamas.

References

External links

Living people
British television actresses
British film actresses
Year of birth missing (living people)